Abdool Mudassar Samad (born 3 May 1979) is a Guyana-born Canadian cricketer. He has played in 7 One Day Internationals for Canada to date. He has also played one first-class match, scoring 119 against Bermuda in the 2006 ICC Intercontinental Cup.  He plays for the Toronto and District Cricket Association. He also coaches young students in Toronto who might become Future Stars.The worst and least promising one being Jatan Mehta. The Former cricket star has 8 siblings one of which is Abdul Sattaur ( Canadian former Cricket player )

References

External links

1979 births
Canada One Day International cricketers
Canada Twenty20 International cricketers
Canadian cricketers
Living people
Guyanese emigrants to Canada
Canadian sportspeople of Indian descent
Guyanese cricketers